This article is about the particular significance of the year 1819 to Wales and its people.

Incumbents
Lord Lieutenant of Anglesey – Henry Paget, 1st Marquess of Anglesey 
Lord Lieutenant of Brecknockshire and Monmouthshire – Henry Somerset, 6th Duke of Beaufort
Lord Lieutenant of Caernarvonshire – Thomas Bulkeley, 7th Viscount Bulkeley
Lord Lieutenant of Cardiganshire – William Edward Powell
Lord Lieutenant of Carmarthenshire – George Rice, 3rd Baron Dynevor 
Lord Lieutenant of Denbighshire – Sir Watkin Williams-Wynn, 5th Baronet    
Lord Lieutenant of Flintshire – Robert Grosvenor, 1st Marquess of Westminster 
Lord Lieutenant of Glamorgan – John Crichton-Stuart, 2nd Marquess of Bute 
Lord Lieutenant of Merionethshire – Sir Watkin Williams-Wynn, 5th Baronet
Lord Lieutenant of Montgomeryshire – Edward Clive, 1st Earl of Powis
Lord Lieutenant of Pembrokeshire – Richard Philipps, 1st Baron Milford
Lord Lieutenant of Radnorshire – George Rodney, 3rd Baron Rodney

Bishop of Bangor – Henry Majendie 
Bishop of Llandaff – Herbert Marsh (until 28 April); William Van Mildert (from 31 May)
Bishop of St Asaph – John Luxmoore 
Bishop of St Davids – Thomas Burgess

Events
 August - Thomas Telford begins construction of the Menai Suspension Bridge.
 date unknown
 The embankment on Telford's Holyhead Road through the Nant Ffrancon Pass is completed.
 The Welsh colony of Cardigan is established in York County, New Brunswick, Canada.
 Robert Bamford Hesketh begins construction of Gwrych Castle.
 Scottish-born London India merchant John Christie purchases a substantial tract of the Great Forest of Brecknock from the Crown.
 Approximate date - John Scandrett Harford and his brothers acquire the Peterwell estate at Lampeter

Arts and literature
 Major eisteddfodau are held at Carmarthen and Denbigh. The Gorsedd tradition (begun by Iolo Morganwg) becomes formally linked with the eisteddfod at Carmarthen.

New books
 William Owen Pughe - Coll Gwynfa (translation of Milton's Paradise Lost)

Music
 "From Greenland’s Icy Mountains", a hymn by Reginald Heber, is sung for the first time, at St Giles' Church, Wrexham.

Births
 3 March - William Ormsby-Gore, 2nd Baron Harlech (died 1904)
 4 November - Arthur Hill-Trevor, 1st Baron Trevor (died 1894)
 7 November - Enoch Salisbury, barrister, politician and bibliophile (died 1890)
 15 November - Arthur Wynn Williams, physician (died 1886)
 7 December - John Cambrian Rowland, painter (died 1890)
 9 December - John Roose Elias, writer (died 1881)

Deaths
 9 January - William Parry, minister and teacher, 74
 31 January - Thomas Bevan, missionary, about 24
 3 February - Mary Bevan, missionary, wife of Thomas Bevan, age unknown
 6 February - David Davies, clergyman and author, 76
 8 February - Sydenham Teak Edwards, botanist, 51
 25 June 
 John Abel, minister, 49
 Sir John Morris, 1st Baronet, industrialist, 73
 11 November - Moses Griffiths, artist, 72

References

 
Wales